Waru is a 2017 New Zealand semi-anthology drama film about the tangi (funeral) of a small boy named Waru who dies at the hands of his caregiver, and how the boy's death impacts the community. After featuring at the New Zealand International Film Festival and Toronto International Film Festival in 2017, it received a general release in New Zealand in October 2017. It has since featured in a number of other film festivals.

Plot Summary 

The film spans eight stories, each starting at 9:59 the morning of the tangi.

Charm

Aunty Charm directs the food preparation for the funeral at the kāuta (kitchen) in the local marae.

Anahera

Waru's kindergarten teacher, Anahera, processes the loss with her class and colleagues.

Mihi

Single mother Mihi struggles to care for her kids with no money for gas or food.

Em

Young singer Em comes home from a raucous night out to find she is locked out of her house, and her baby is inside.

Ranui

Two great-grandmothers of Waru, Ranui and Hinga, argue over where his body should rest so that his wairua (spirit) is at peace.

Kiritapu

Anchorwoman Kiritapu endures microaggressions and overt racism alike while her colleagues discuss the murder of Waru.

Mere

Young teen Mere, armed with a tokotoko, plucks up the courage to talk back to her abuser.

Titty & Bash 

Two sisters, Titty and Bash, drive to reclaim Bash's children from an abusive household.

Cast 
 Tanea Heke as Aunty Charm
 Roimata Fox as Anahera
 Ngapaki Moetara as Mihi
 Awhina-Rose Ashby as Em
 Kararaina Rangihau as Ranui
 Merehaka Maaka as Hinga
 Maria Walker as Kiritapu
 Acacia Hapi as Mere
 Amber Curreen as "Titty" (short for Whatitiri or "thunder" in Māori)
 Miriama McDowell as "Bash" (a nickname derived from Uira or "lightning" in Māori)

Production 
The film consists of eight 10-minute long takes, each written and directed by nine Māori women. The producers issued a challenge to the film-makers: Each story had to have a female lead, begin at 9:59am, and be shot in one day, using one continuous take. NZ On Air and New Zealand Film Commission funding was obtained in 2015.

References

External links 
 
 

2017 films
New Zealand drama films
Māori-language films
Films shot in New Zealand
Films by indigenous directors
Films about Māori people
2010s New Zealand films